Scopula erici is a moth of the family Geometridae. It is found in Uganda and the Republic of Congo.

Subspecies
Scopula erici erici (Uganda)
Scopula erici euparypha (Prout, 1913) (Republic of Congo)

References

Moths described in 1896
erici
Insects of Uganda
Fauna of the Republic of the Congo
Moths of Africa